Memtimin Qadir (born November 1965) is a Chinese politician of Uyghur origin who has been the mayor of Ürümqi since 20 April 2021. He previously served as mayor of Turpan from 2018 to 2021. He is a delegate to the 13th National People's Congress.

Biography
Memtimin Qadir was born in Aksu Prefecture, Xinjiang, in November 1965. In 1981, he enrolled in the Health School of Aksu Prefecture, where he graduated in 1984. He joined the Communist Party of China (CPC) in March 1989.

In August 1984, he became an official at Keping People's Hospital and moved to Yuli People's Hospital in April 1986, where he eventually became vice president of the hospital in May 1992. In August 1993, he was appointed deputy head of the Organization Department of CPC Yuli County Committee, and then director of the Withdrawal Department of Bayingolin Mongolian Autonomous Prefecture People's Hospital in October 1995. He was promoted to be deputy party secretary of Luntai County in December 1997, concurrently holding the magistrate position since March 2001. In June 2007, he became deputy party branch secretary of the Science and Technology Bureau of Bayingolin Mongolian Autonomous Prefecture, concurrently serving as director since the following month. In December 2013, he was nominated as vice chairman of Bayingolin Mongolian Autonomous Prefecture People's Congress, confirmed in January 2014. He served as deputy mayor of Turpan in November 2017, and two month later promoted to the mayor position. In April 2021, he was rose to become mayor of a major city, of Ürümqi, the capital of Xinjiang.

References

1965 births
Living people
People from Aksu Prefecture
Uyghur politicians
Central Party School of the Chinese Communist Party alumni
Mayors of Turpan
Mayors of Ürümqi
People's Republic of China politicians from Xinjiang
Chinese Communist Party politicians from Xinjiang
Delegates to the 13th National People's Congress